The Union of South Africa competed at the 1956 Summer Olympics in Melbourne, Australia. 50 competitors, 44 men and 6 women, took part in 50 events in 10 sports.

Medalists

Bronze
 Daniel Bekker — Boxing, Men's Heavyweight
 Henry Loubscher — Boxing, Men's Light Welterweight 
 Alfred Swift — Cycling, Men's 1.000m Time Trial 
 Moira Abernethy, Jeanette Myburgh, Natalie Myburgh and Susan Roberts — Swimming, Women's 4 × 100 m Freestyle Relay

Athletics

Men's 110m Hurdles 
Danie Burger
 Heat — 14.4s
 Semifinals — 15.0s (→ did not advance)

Men's Marathon 
Mercer Davis — 2:39:48 (→ 14th place)
Jan Barnard — did not finish (→ no ranking)

Men's Discus Throw 
Fanie du Plessis
 Qualifying Heat — 50.69
 Final — 48.49 (→ 13th place)

Boxing

Cycling

Sprint
Thomas Shardelow — 8th place

Time trial
Alfred Swift — 1:11.6 (→  Bronze Medal)

Tandem
Raymond RobinsonThomas Shardelow — 7th place

Team pursuit
Alfred SwiftAnne Jan HettemaCharles JonkerRobert Fowler — 4:39.4 (→ 4th place)

Individual road race
Alfred Swift — did not finish (→ no ranking)
Robert Fowler — did not finish (→ no ranking)
Anne Jan Hettema — did not finish (→ no ranking)
Charles Jonker — did not finish (→ no ranking)

Gymnastics

Modern pentathlon

Three male pentathletes represented South Africa in 1956.

Individual
 Okkie van Greunen
 Harry Schmidt
 Marthinus du Plessis

Team
 Okkie van Greunen
 Harry Schmidt
 Marthinus du Plessis

Sailing

Shooting

Two shooters represented South Africa in 1956.

50 m rifle, three positions
 Robin Lavine

50 m rifle, prone
 Johannes Human
 Robin Lavine

Swimming

Weightlifting

Wrestling

References

External links
Official Olympic Reports
International Olympic Committee results database

Nations at the 1956 Summer Olympics
1956
1956 in South African sport